XHTCP-FM is a radio station on 90.7 FM in Tehuacán, Puebla. It carries Radiorama's Romántica format.

History
XETCP-AM 1600 received its concession on September 25, 1996, soon moving to 1230. It has always been owned by Radiorama.

XETCP was cleared to move to FM in 2011.

References

Radio stations in Puebla